Choiseul is an illustrious noble family from Champagne, France, descendants of the comtes of Langres.  The family's head was Renaud III de Choiseul, comte de Langres and sire de Choiseul, who in 1182 married Alix de Dreux, daughter of Louis VI of France.  It has formed into the Langres, Clémont, Aigremont, Beaugré, Allecourt, Frontières, Praslin, Plessis branches, among others.  It also took the name Choiseul-Gouffier from the 18th century onwards.

It has produced several marshals: 
 Jean de Baudricourt (?–1499), seigneur of Baudricourt and of Choiseul
 Charles de Choiseul, comte of the Plessis-Praslin (1563–1626), who served under Henri IV and Louis XIII 
 César de Choiseul du Plessis-Praslin, duc de Choiseul (1598–1675), who defied Turenne at Rethel (1650), when he commanded the Spanish army 
 César, duc de Choiseul (1602–1675), French marshal and diplomat, generally known for the best part of his life as marshal du Plessis-Praslin 
 Claude de Choiseul, comte de Choiseul-Francières (1632–1711), who distinguished himself in the battle of Seneffe against the Dutch Republic and made a marshal in 1693

Two bishops and an archbishop:
 Gilbert de Choiseul du Plessis Praslin (1613–31 December 1689 at Tournai), Bishop of Comminges from 1644 to 1670; brother of marshal César de Choiseul du Plessis-Praslin
 Gabriel-Florent de Choiseul-Beaupré (1718–1723), bishop of Saint-Papoul, bishop of Mende
 Antoine-Clériade de Choiseul-Beaupré (1754–1774), Archbishop of Besançon

Also a famous minister, a diplomat, etc. :
 Étienne François, duc de Choiseul (1719–1785), ambassador then Secretary of State to Louis XV
 César Gabriel de Choiseul, duc de Praslin (1712–1785), cousin of the former, ambassador then secretary of state to Louis XV
 Marie-Gabriel-Florent-Auguste de Choiseul-Gouffier (1752–1817), French writer
 Claude Antoine Gabriel, duc de Choiseul-Stainville (1760–1838), French writer and peer
 Charles de Choiseul-Praslin (1805–1847), 5th Duke of Praslin, French député and peer
 Gaston Louis Philippe de Choiseul-Praslin (1834–1906), 6th Duke of Praslin, married to Mary Elizabeth Forbes, sister of H. De Courcy Forbes
 Horace de Choiseul-Praslin (23 February 1837 – 26 December 1915) 
 Comte Eugène Antonio (Antoine) Horace de Choiseul-Praslin, a French politician.